The 2008 Porsche Mobil 1 Supercup season was the 16th Porsche Supercup season. The races were all supporting races in the 2008 Formula One season. It travelled to ten circuits across Europe and also a double-header in Bahrain.

Teams and drivers

Race calendar and results

Championship standings

† — Drivers did not finish the race, but were classified as they completed over 90% of the race distance.

 – David Saelens scored a point despite not finishing the race.

References

External links
The Porsche Mobil 1 Supercup website
Porsche Mobil 1 Supercup Online Magazine

Porsche Supercup seasons
Porsche Supercup